Su Wenmao (January 24, 1929 — May 3, 2015) was a Chinese xiangsheng comedian.

He was born on January 24, 1929, to a poor family. In his youth, he greatly enjoyed xiangsheng. In the 1940s, he worked as a teacher in Tianjin.

References

1929 births
2015 deaths
Male actors from Beijing
Chinese xiangsheng performers